The following is a list of television series produced in Austria :

References

External links
 Austrian TV at the Internet Movie Database

 
Austria